John H. Morrison (born 1933) is a former senior partner of Kirkland & Ellis (retired 1999) and former President of the Association of American Rhodes Scholars.  He is married to Barbara Morrison, and has three adult daughters, Marlene Morrison Turvill, Melanie Lanning Sweeney, and Meredith Horton Morrison.

Education:
University of New Mexico, BBA 1955 
University of Oxford (Rhodes Scholar - University College), BA in Jurisprudence 1957, MA 1961 
Harvard Law School, JD 1962

Practice:

From 1962 until January 1999, John practiced at Kirkland & Ellis in Chicago. Prior to his retirement at age 65, John worked in the areas of antitrust and trade regulation (both civil and criminal litigation), product liability and general business litigation. In the late 1990s, John had responsibility for certain loss prevention matters at Kirkland & Ellis, including active supervision of the conflicts of interest procedures.

Since retiring from private practice, John has continued his active arbitration practice which began in about 1968. He has arbitrated 17 significant commercial cases since 1990, mostly under AAA commercial rules (including AAA international rules), some as panel chair and a number as sole arbitrator.

See also
https://web.archive.org/web/20110707084359/http://www.adrchambersinternational.com/cvmorrison.htm
https://web.archive.org/web/20080517000050/http://www.cidra.org/resumes/jmor.htm

1933 births
University of New Mexico alumni
American Rhodes Scholars
Harvard Law School alumni
Living people
People associated with Kirkland & Ellis